Styphnic acid (from Greek stryphnos "astringent"), or 2,4,6-trinitro-1,3-benzenediol, is a yellow astringent acid that forms hexagonal crystals. It is used in the manufacture of dyes, pigments, inks, medicines, and explosives such as lead styphnate. It is itself a low sensitivity explosive, similar to picric acid, but explodes upon rapid heating.

Preparation and chemistry

It may be prepared by the nitration of resorcinol with a mixture of nitric and sulfuric acid.

This compound is an example of a trinitrophenol.

Like picric acid, it is a moderately strong acid, capable of displacing carbon dioxide from solutions of sodium carbonate, for example.

It may be reacted with weakly basic oxides, such as those of lead and silver, to form the corresponding salts.

The solubility of picric acid and styphnic acid in water is less than their corresponding mono- and di-nitro compounds, and far less than their non-nitrated precursor phenols, so they may be purified by fractional crystallisation.

References

Nitrophenols
Explosive chemicals
Resorcinols
Organic acids